Cho Min-Kook (born July 5, 1963) is a South Korean former footballer and football coach who played for the whole of his career as a defender for Lucky-Goldstar Hwangso and LG Cheetahs. He managed K League Classic side Ulsan Hyundai for the 2014 season.

Honours

Player
Lucky-Goldstar Hwangso / LG Cheetahs
 K-League Winners (1): 1990
 K-League Runners-up (1) : 1986, 1989
 Korean National Football Championship Winners (1) : 1988

Individual
 K-League Best XI : 1986

Club career statistics

International goals
Results list South Korea's goal tally first.

External links
 
 
 

1963 births
Living people
Association football defenders
South Korean footballers
South Korea international footballers
South Korean football managers
K League 1 players
FC Seoul players
Avispa Fukuoka players
Ulsan Hyundai FC managers
Daejeon Hana Citizen FC managers
1986 FIFA World Cup players
Footballers at the 1988 Summer Olympics
1988 AFC Asian Cup players
1990 FIFA World Cup players
Olympic footballers of South Korea
Asian Games medalists in football
Asian Games gold medalists for South Korea
Footballers at the 1986 Asian Games
Medalists at the 1986 Asian Games
Footballers from Seoul